The Land Rover Defender is a four-wheel-drive off-road SUV from British automotive company Jaguar Land Rover. The car was launched on 10 September 2019 at the Frankfurt Motor Show. It is significant for being the first all-new version of the Defender, breaking the engineering lineage with its predecessor, a descendant of the original Series Land Rovers of 1948. The unibody-based Defender is aimed at a more upmarket segment than its predecessor.

Background
The Defender replaces the original Land Rover Defender (1983-2016). The cars are built in Slovakia at Jaguar Land Rover's Nitra plant, a manufacturing facility which opened on 25 October 2018. The plant covers an area of about 300,000 square metres.

The car, which shares no components or technology with its predecessor Defender model, features permanent all-wheel drive, locking differentials in the centre and rear, and a two-speed transfer case. Unlike the previous Defender models, the new model will feature an aluminium unibody instead of a body-on-frame construction. All Defender 110 variants come with air suspension as standard whilst the 90 can be optioned with coil springs or air suspension. Deliveries to customers of the 5-door Defender 110 began in early 2020, to be followed by the 3-door Defender 90 in late 2020.

Reception
The Defender has been well received by the motoring press, all reviews underlining that it is significantly different from its chassis-based predecessor: "It’s all very Defender – but not as we know it" declared the Evening Standard; "Born-again off-roader follows a new path and is all the better for it" declared the Motoring website. "Combine (its) seemingly impossible blend of qualities with a fantastic looking package inside and out and you have a vehicle that is literally like no other". A TFL Car review was critical of the quality of the cars, with readers giving accounts of problems within the first few weeks of ownerships and with only up to a few hundred miles of driving. Poor reliability has been a recurring theme with many Land Rover models.

In 2019, Lego announced a 2,573-piece "LEGO Land Rover Defender" set based on the vehicle, released in October 2019. It is one of the largest sets ever made by Lego.

Specifications

Mechanical specifications

The initial engine choice will be from the following JLR Ingenium engines: 
D200 - a  2.0-litre 4-cylinder turbodiesel with a fuel consumption of )
P400e which is only available for the 110 which makes  and has . 
For the 2021 model year (announced September 2020), the following JLR Ingenium in-line 6-cylinder diesel engines with mild hybrid technology are available: D200, D250, D300.

All variants are fitted with a ZF 8-speed automatic transmission coupled with a 2-speed transfer case. The optional steel wheels are only available on Defenders with the smaller, less powerful four-cylinder engines as the six-cylinder engine requires larger disk brakes to be fitted.

In the US and Canada, the 90 model is only offered in a limited edition First Edition and the 3.0 6 cylinder engine while the 110 is offered in both the limited edition First Edition with 3.0 engine as well as the regular models with both 3.0 or 2.0 engines.

Trim levels and interior
The Defender is available in Standard, S, SE, XS, HSE, X, V8 and V8 Carpathian Edition trim lines. Land Rover also offers four accessory packs, called Explorer, Adventure, Urban and Country, which include various accessories such as a raised air intake, extended mud flaps, a side-mounted storage box, and more.

The entry-level 110 models will come equipped with air suspension, 18-inch steel wheels, LED headlights, and a 10.0-inch touchscreen infotainment system. The Defender 90 comes with coil springs, a standard front jump seat that adds a third seating position to the front row. Models with front bucket seats can be equipped with a wide centre console. The car debuts Jaguar Land Rover's Pivi Pro infotainment system, accessed through a 10-inch touch screen.

Special Editions

2021 Bond Edition Defender 
Released alongside the 25th James Bond movie, No Time to Die, the Bond Edition Defenders were three hundred 2020 Defenders created by Land Rover to celebrate the car's appearance in the film. The Bond Edition Defender used a 518 Horsepower 5.0 Litre supercharged V8 and utilised the same gearbox as the standard V8 model. It came with all black exterior and 22" black alloy wheels paired with a rear 'Defender 007' badge and blue brake calipers. The infotainment system was fitted with a custom startup screen to commemorate Land Rover's long lasting relations with the bond franchise. The interior sported 'Defender 007' treadplates and all black seating. The car also sports exterior 007 graphic puddle lamps. The cars had either 90 or 110 wheelbases and had a starting price of £105,000.

75th Anniversary Limited Edition 
The Land Rover Defender 75th Anniversary Edition is a modified variant of the 2020 Defender with all green paint, for both the main body, wheels and interior cross beam. It is available in either a 300 horsepower, mild or plug-in automatic, all wheel drive diesel hybrid. The 75th Anniversary Edition also features a unique '75 Years' graphic placed across the entire vehicle. It can be purchased with either a panoramic sunroof or folding fabric roof. The mild hybrid version can be purchased with either 90" or 110" wheelbases, whilst the plug-in is strictly the 110" variant. The starting price for this car is around £86,000 ($105,000)

Safety
The Defender has been tested to 5 stars by Euro NCAP.

Future variants
A shorter wheelbase version reportedly called the "80" will arrive in 2022. The shorter wheelbase Defender has not been released and no official Land Rover media exists for it. It is now speculated by third parties for 2023.

Defender 90 engine specifications

Defender 110 engine specifications

References

External links

 

Defender (L663)
Cars introduced in 2019
2020s cars
Retro-style automobiles
Compact sport utility vehicles
Mid-size sport utility vehicles
Off-road vehicles
All-wheel-drive vehicles
Euro NCAP large off-road